Fabrizio Tescari (born 6 April 1969) is an Italian former alpine skier.

He is married to former alpine skier Morena Gallizio.

Career
During his career he has achieved 14 results among the top 10 (1 victory) in the World Cup. He competed in the 1994 Winter Olympics and 1998 Winter Olympics.

National titles
Tescari has won two national championships at individual senior level.

Italian Alpine Ski Championships
Slalom: 1992, 1997

References

External links
 
 

1969 births
Living people
Italian male alpine skiers
Olympic alpine skiers of Italy
Alpine skiers at the 1994 Winter Olympics
Alpine skiers at the 1998 Winter Olympics
Alpine skiers of Gruppo Sportivo Forestale